Fujisawa Dam  is an earthfill dam located in Hokkaido Prefecture in Japan. The dam is used for irrigation. The catchment area of the dam is 3.5 km2. The dam impounds about 13  ha of land when full and can store 600 thousand cubic meters of water. The construction of the dam was completed in 1923.

References

Dams in Hokkaido